Blackford is an area in the south of Edinburgh, the capital city of Scotland. It is located near Morningside, and The Grange. Blackford Hill dominates the view to the south. The majority of the Blackford is now housing, mostly dating from the Victorian or Edwardian eras.

The local parish church of the Church of Scotland is the Reid Memorial Church, which was opened in 1935.

See also
 Jordan Burn
 Blackford Hill
 Blackford Pond

References

External links
Bartholomew's Chronological map of Edinburgh (1919)
 The Royal Observatory, Edinburgh

Areas of Edinburgh